Yuki Seno (born 30 December 1996) is a Japanese professional footballer who plays as a midfielder for WE League club Chifure AS Elfen Saitama.

Club career 
Seno made her WE League debut on 12 September 2021.

References 

Living people
1996 births
Japanese women's footballers
Women's association football midfielders
Association football people from Saitama Prefecture
Chifure AS Elfen Saitama players
WE League players